Seamus O'Connor (born October 4, 1997) is an American-born snowboarder, from Ramona, California, who competes internationally for Ireland. He competed for Ireland at the 2014 Winter Olympics in the men's halfpipe and men's slopestyle events. He was the Irish flag bearer in the opening ceremony of the 2018 Winter Olympics. Seamus finished in eighteenth place in the Men's halfpipe qualification at the 2018 Winter Olympics.

O'Connor's paternal grandparents were born in Ireland, making him eligible to compete for the country.

He resides in Park City, Utah.

See also
 Ireland at the 2014 Winter Olympics

References

External links
 
 
 
 
 World Snowboard Tour Profile
 Sochi2014 Profile

Irish male snowboarders
American male snowboarders
1997 births
Living people
Snowboarders at the 2014 Winter Olympics
Snowboarders at the 2018 Winter Olympics
Snowboarders at the 2022 Winter Olympics
Olympic snowboarders of Ireland
People from San Diego
American people of Irish descent